The Anderson Homestead, located in Clay County, South Dakota east of Hub City, South Dakota on the county line road between Clay County and Union County, South Dakota, dates from 1876.  It was listed on the National Register of Historic Places in 1978.  The listing included 13 contributing buildings, three contributing structures, and a contributing site.

It includes a large Classical Revival-style farmhouse built in 1901, 21 outbuildings, and an original small hall and parlor plan farmhouse which was built in 1871 or 1876 by Olaf Erickson, who immigrated from Sweden.

References

		
National Register of Historic Places in Clay County, South Dakota
Neoclassical architecture in South Dakota
Buildings and structures completed in 1876